Paweł Kołodziński (born 7 January 1988 in Gdańsk) is a Polish sailor. He competed at the 2012 Summer Olympics in the 49er class finishing in 13th place.

References

External links
sports-reference.com

Polish male sailors (sport)
1988 births
Living people
Olympic sailors of Poland
Sailors at the 2012 Summer Olympics – 49er
Sportspeople from Gdańsk
Sailors at the 2016 Summer Olympics – 49er
Sailors at the 2020 Summer Olympics – 49er